Khakhi is a town and union council of Dera Ghazi Khan District in the Punjab province of Pakistan. It has an altitude of 111 metres (367 feet).

References

Populated places in Dera Ghazi Khan District
Union councils of Dera Ghazi Khan District
Cities and towns in Punjab, Pakistan